No Comment is a 1984 Front 242 album released on the Another Side music label.  The album was the first reference to Electronic Body Music (EBM)  when the band included the phrase "Electronic Body Music Composed and Produced On Eight Tracks by Front 242" in reference to their use of an 8-track recording device.  Though the album was their second full-length album, the Belgian band had released several singles and EPs prior to No Comment.  The dialogue samples featured in the track "Special Forces" are from the movie Apocalypse Now.

Track listing
No Comment has been released multiple times in both LP and CD formats in Belgium, Germany, and the United States.  The following is a list of the tracks on all the significant releases of this album.

Another Side (1984) and Wax Trax! (1985) LP versions 

Note : initial copies of the Wax Trax! LP also contained a bonus live 7" single

Red Rhino CD version (1985)

Wax Trax! CD version (1988)

Wax Trax! Cassette Version (1989)

Epic CD version (1992) 

The 1992 Epic Records rerelease of No Comment slightly changed the EBM reference, which read "Electronic body music recorded on 8 tracks".

Credits 
 Jean-Luc de Meyer – lead vocals
 Daniel Bresanutti – keyboards, programming, live mixing
 Patrick Codenys – keyboards, programming, sampling
 Richard Jonckheere – percussion, backing vocals

References

External links 
 Entry at Discogs

1984 albums
Front 242 albums
Wax Trax! Records albums
Red Rhino Records albums
Epic Records albums